A fish screen is designed to prevent fish from swimming or being drawn into an aqueduct, cooling water intake, intake tower, dam or other diversion on a river, lake or waterway where water is taken for human use. They are intended to supply debris-free water without harming aquatic life. Fish screens are typically installed to protect endangered species of fishes that would otherwise be harmed or killed when passing through industrial facilities such as steam electric power plants, hydroelectric generators, petroleum refineries, chemical plants, farm irrigation water and municipal drinking water treatment plants. However, many fish are killed or injured on screens or elsewhere in the intake structures.

Design

Industrial facilities
Fish screens may be positive barriers (devices such as a perforated metal plate that physically prevents fish from passing) or behavioral barriers (devices that encourage fish to swim away). Most behavioral barriers are experimental and of unproven effectiveness.

Positive barriers are often effective at keeping aquatic organisms from entering a cooling system, but may also kill them by impinging them on the screens. These barrier types are widely used and include:
 Modified traveling screens
 Fish handling and return systems
 Horizontal, flat-plate screens with bypass water return systems
 Cylindrical wedge wire screens
 Fine-mesh screens
 Fish net barriers.
Besides simply preventing fish from passing, fish screens are designed to minimize stress and injury that occur when fish impact the screen or are subjected to changes in water velocity and direction caused by the diversion.

The U.S. Environmental Protection Agency (EPA) has evaluated other barrier technologies and identified some as potentially effective, although not widely demonstrated (as of 2004):
 Aquatic microfiltration barriers
 Angled and modular inclined screens
 Velocity caps.

Some fish screens are designed to protect a single species of fish (for example, salmon) and are not necessarily effective at protecting other fish species. Some screens are capable of protecting more than one species or type of life. Additionally, some screens may effectively protect juvenile and adult fish, but not fish eggs and larvae.

The cost of a fish screen varies from thousands of US dollars for small, low-flow-rate screens to millions of US dollars in the case of very large custom-designed systems that filter a large flow of water. Maintenance costs can be significant, including repairs, removing trash, and adjusting the equipment for changes in stream conditions.

Non-industrial applications
For some low volume, non-industrial water diversion applications, there are screens available that have no moving parts, do not require electricity, and have very little need for maintenance.

Impacts on aquatic life

Many power plants and other industries in the U.S. continue to use screens that impinge fish. For example, the cooling system at the Indian Point Energy Center in New York kills over a billion fish eggs and larvae annually. At the Bay Shore Power Plant in Ohio, 46 million fish were killed over an 18-month period. Organisms that pass through the screens are killed or stressed (depending on the species) as they become entrained in the cooling system. 208 million fish eggs and over 2 billion small and larval fish were entrained at the Bay Shore plant over the same 18 months. EPA estimates that billions of fish and other organisms are killed each year in cooling water intakes.

Legal requirements
In the United States, the National Marine Fisheries Service, a division of NOAA, mandates positive-barrier fishscreens in most new diversions from waterways where endangered or threatened fish species occur. Some existing unscreened diversions whose construction pre-dates fish-screen mandates are allowed to continue operating by grandfather rule.

The U.S. Clean Water Act requires EPA to issue regulations on industrial cooling water intake structures. The agency issued regulations for new facilities in 2001 (amended 2003), and for existing facilities in 2014.

See also
 Fish ladder
 Fish weir

References

External links
 Cooling Water Intakes - U.S. EPA regulatory program
 Install Time Lapse - Time lapse video of a small fish conservation screen being installed

Aquatic ecology
Fish conservation